Umbrella palm is a common name for several plants and may refer to:

 Hedyscepe canterburyana, a palm tree in the family Arecaceae
 Cyperus alternifolius,  a sedge in the family Cyperaceae